Petar Jovanović (1655 – 4 April 1736), known as Pera Segedinac, was a Habsburg Serb military officer, a captain in Pomorišje. He led a Serb revolt in 1735.

What is known about him is that he was a retired officer in the Serbian Militia stationed at Szeged, hence the name "Segedinac". At the age of 80, Captain Pero joined forces with Hungarian peasants revolting against insufferable conditions in Bekes, Csongrád and Zarand counties in 1735. After the revolt, Pero and several Hungarian rebels were captured, tortured, and executed in Buda the following year.

Literature
Laza Kostić (1841–1910) wrote the play Pera Segedinac in 1875.

See also
 Jovan Monasterlija
 Pavle Nestorović
 Antonije Znorić
 Subota Jović

Sources

1655 births
1736 deaths
18th-century Serbian people
17th-century Serbian people
Habsburg Serbs
People from Szeged
People of the Great Turkish War
Austro-Turkish War (1716–1718)
Serbs of Hungary